To Love Again may refer to:

Music
To Love Again (Diana Ross album), 1981
To Love Again: The Duets, a 2005 album by Chris Botti
"To Love Again (song)", a 2009 single by Alesha Dixon
"To Love Again", a 1956 song by The Four Aces
"To Love Again", a song by Diana Ross from her 1978 album Ross
"To Love Again", a song by David "Fathead" Newman from the 1982 album Still Hard Times
"To Love Again", a song by Lara Fabian from the 2000 album Lara Fabian
"To Love Again", a 2018 song by Jocelyn Enriquez

Other uses
To Love Again (film), a 1971 Japanese film
To Love Again, a 1981 book by Danielle Steel

See also

To Live Again (disambiguation)